Kay Oppenheimer is a Democratic member of the New Hampshire House of Representatives, representing the Strafford 3rd District since 2006.  At the conclusion of the second year of the session (2008), Oppenheimer had a voting record attendance rate of 28%.

External links
New Hampshire House of Representatives - Kay Oppenheimer official NH House website
 "Roll Call Record for Kay Oppenheimer
Project Vote Smart - Representative Kay Oppenheimer (NH) profile
Follow the Money - Kay Oppenheimer
2006 campaign contributions

Members of the New Hampshire House of Representatives
Living people
Women state legislators in New Hampshire
Year of birth missing (living people)
People from Strafford, New Hampshire
21st-century American women